|}

The Duke of Edinburgh Stakes is a flat Handicap horse race in Great Britain open to horses of three-year-old and up. It is run at Ascot over a distance of 1 mile 3 furlongs and 211 yards (2,406 metres), and it is scheduled to take place each year in June.

The race was previously known as the Bessborough Stakes and was named after John Ponsonby, 5th Earl of Bessborough who was Master of the Buckhounds on three occasions in the 19th century. The first race under the original name was a five furlong race for two-year-olds run at Royal Ascot in 1914. The title was later bestowed on a mile and a half handicap race at the same meeting. In 1999 the race was renamed in honour of Prince Philip, Duke of Edinburgh. The name Duke of Edinburgh Stakes had previously been used for a two-year-old race run at Ascot in autumn whose winners included the future Champion Hurdler Sea Pigeon.

The race has been won by horses who have gone on to win at Group level, including Blueprint (Jockey Club Stakes), Young Mick (Cumberland Lodge Stakes) and Fox Hunt (Deutsches St Leger).

Winners since 1982
 Weights given in stones and pounds.

See also
 Horse racing in Great Britain
 List of British flat horse races

References

 Paris-Turf:
Racing Post

Flat races in Great Britain
Ascot Racecourse
Open middle distance horse races
Recurring sporting events established in 1914
1914 establishments in England